North Carolina elected its members August 14, 1817.

See also 
 1816 North Carolina's 5th congressional district special election
 1816 North Carolina's 6th congressional district special election
 1816 North Carolina's 6th congressional district special election
 1816 and 1817 United States House of Representatives elections
 List of United States representatives from North Carolina

Notes 

1817
North Carolina
United States House of Representatives